The Bahamas is an archipelagic state of the Lucayan Archipelago consisting of more than 700 islands, cays, and islets in the Atlantic Ocean. The Bahamas became an independent Commonwealth realm in 1973, retaining Queen Elizabeth II as its monarch. In terms of gross domestic product per capita, the Bahamas is one of the richest countries in the Americas (following the United States and Canada), with an economy based on tourism and finance. Tourism alone provides an estimated 45% of the gross domestic product (GDP) and employs about half the Bahamian workforce. In 2016, over 3 million tourists visited the Bahamas, most of whom are from the United States and Canada.

Notable firms 
This list includes notable companies with primary headquarters located in the country. The industry and sector follow the Industry Classification Benchmark taxonomy. Organizations which have ceased operations are included and noted as defunct.

References 

 
Bahamas